La Buena Esperanza (Ladino: The Good Hope) was a Ladino language weekly newspaper which was published in Smyrna, Ottoman Empire, in the period 1871–1912, being the longest-run Ladino newspaper in the city.

History and profile
La Buena Esperanza was launched in Smyrna in 1871. The founder and editor of the paper which was published on a weekly basis was Aron de Yosef Hazan. He was an Italian-origin Jewish who was working as a teacher at the Alliance Israélite Universelle school in Smyrna. He closed down La Buena Esperanza in 1912 when he had to leave the city because of the invasion of Tripoli by the Italian Empire.

References

1871 establishments in the Ottoman Empire
1912 disestablishments in the Ottoman Empire
Defunct newspapers published in the Ottoman Empire
Defunct weekly newspapers
Jewish newspapers
Publications established in 1871
Publications disestablished in 1912
Judaeo-Spanish-language newspapers
Weekly newspapers published in Turkey
Zionism in the Ottoman Empire
Jews and Judaism in İzmir
Ottoman İzmir/Smyrna